Holy Spirit is an aspect of God in Abrahamic religions.

Holy Spirit may refer to:

Religion 
 Holy Spirit in Judaism, Ruach HaKodesh, the Spirit of YHWH in the Hebrew Bible (Tanakh) and Jewish writings
 Holy Spirit in Christianity, person of the Trinity; interpreted differently by Non-Trinitarians
Holy Spirit (Christian denominational variations), the various Christian doctrines of the Holy Spirit
 Holy Spirit in Islam, Ruh al-Quds, in the Quran, interpreted by some people as the angel Gabriel

Religious orders 
 Holy Spirit Adoration Sisters, Roman Catholic religious institute of cloistered nuns
 Daughters of the Holy Spirit, Roman Catholic religious institute of women
 Missionaries of the Holy Spirit, Catholic religious institute founded in Mexico City in 1914 by Félix de Jesús Rougier

Places of worship 
 Holy Spirit Cathedral (disambiguation)
 Church of the Holy Spirit (disambiguation)
 Monastery of the Holy Spirit near Conyers, Georgia, USA

Schools 
 Holy Spirit College, Atlanta, Georgia, USA
 Holy Spirit School (disambiguation)

Other religious institutions 
 Bank of the Holy Spirit, Italian bank
 Holy Spirit Hospital, Camp Hill, Pennsylvania, USA

Other uses 
Holy Spirit may also refer to:
 Order of the Holy Spirit, French chivalric order
 Holy Spirit Movement, Ugandan rebel group

See also 
 Espírito Santo (disambiguation) (Portuguese)
 Espiritu Santo (disambiguation) (Spanish)
 Holy Ghost (disambiguation)
 Spirit of God (disambiguation)
 Sancti Spiritus (disambiguation) (Latin)
 Spirito Santo (disambiguation) (Italian)

 Holy Spirit